is a Japanese actress, entertainer, singer, and scholar who was formerly represented by the talent agency, Parfit Production. On June 22, 2020, Kikuchi announced that she has left Parfit Production and gone independent.

Her ex-husband is professional golfer Tetsu Nishikawa. Kikuchi was also a brand adviser for such women's goods as Emom and Momokoselection.

Biography

Idol era
Momoko Kikuchi was born in Shinagawa, Tokyo, Japan, scouted in 1982, and started to make TV appearances in 1983. She officially made her debut as an idol in 1984, releasing her first single just before her 16th birthday, and instantly shot to fame. She produced seven consecutive no. 1 songs on the Oricon Chart from 1985 to 1987.

In the late 80s, Kikuchi tried to shed the "idol" label and formed RA-MU, a band featuring more original material and rock music, but the band failed to be recognized. Unwilling to return to perform as an idol singing mainstream bubblegum pop, Kikuchi shifted her focus to acting from there on, and has been successful as an actress.

In 2011, Japanese music program Music Station held a special report counting down the Top 50 Idols of All-Time based on their singles' total sales. The list spans several decades, and Kikuchi was in the 42nd place, with a sales record of 4,110,000 copies.

In April 2014, Kikuchi celebrated her 30th anniversary in the show business by releasing her seventh album, the first since 1991, which is a re-recording of all her hit songs during her idol period.

Current
In November 2019, Kikuchi married technocrat Hiroaki Niihara.

Discography

Studio albums

Singles

Compilations

Filmography

TV series

Films

References

External links
  
 Official profile 

1968 births
Japanese actresses
Japanese women singers
Japanese idols
Living people
People from Shinagawa
Singers from Tokyo